Mlake may refer to the following places in Slovenia:

Mlake, Muta
Mlake, Metlika